Milton Powell (born November 29, 1977), better known by his stage name Big Pokey, is an American rapper from Houston, Texas. Pokey is associated with chopped and screwed music, and is one of the original members of the Screwed Up Click.

Rap career 
Big Pokey began rapping with Houston producer DJ Screw in the early 1990s releasing songs on many of DJ Screw's mixtapes. Big Pokey was featured on DJ Screw's mixtape "June 27th Freestyle" which became a landmark album in chopped and screwed hip hop.

His first full-length album, Hardest Pit in the Litter,  appeared in early 1999. The following year, Pokey returned with D-Game 2000, another album of mid-tempo 808-driven beats featuring several of his Houston peers as guests. In 2001, he collaborated with the Wreckshop Wolfpack for Tha Collabo and then returned in 2002 with another solo album, Da Sky's Da Limit. In 2004, a clip of Pokey's song "Who Dat Talkin Down" was featured in the pilot episode of HBO's Entourage. In 2005 Pokey was featured on Paul Wall's track "Sittin' Sidewayz" which peaked at #93 on US Billboard Hot 100.

Film appearance 
In 2001, Pokey appeared in the film "Soldiers United for Cash." He also starred in the movie Dirty Third 2: Home Sweet Home

Discography

Studio albums

Mixtapes
 2003: Mob 4 Life (with Chris Ward)
 2004: A Bad Azz Mix Tape Vol. 3
 2004: The Best Of Big Pokey II (8ighted & Chopped)
 2005: Since The Grey Tapes Vol. 3 (with Lil' Keke)
 2007: On Another Note
 2008: Keep On Stackin, Vol. 3: Smoked Out... Beatin!!! (with Lil C)
 2008: Screwed Up Gorillaz (with E.S.G.)
 2010: Warning Shot

References

See also
Houston hip hop

1977 births
Living people
African-American male rappers
American male rappers
Rappers from Houston
Screwed Up Click members
Underground rappers
Gangsta rappers
21st-century American rappers
21st-century American male musicians
21st-century African-American musicians
20th-century African-American people